A task force is a group set up to focus on a specific goal.

Task force may also refer to:
 Chevrolet Task Force, a GM line of trucks from 1955-1959
 Falklands Task Force, the United Kingdom military forces assembled to retake the Falkland Islands from Argentina in 1982
 Task Force (band), a Hip Hop group from Britain
 Task Force (film), a 1949 military film about Naval aviation, starring Gary Cooper
 Task Force Games, a game company started in 1979 by Allen Eldridge and Stephen Cole
 Task Force Harrier EX, a vertical scrolling shooter video game for the Sega Genesis
 Task Force Talon, a top-secret U.S. military branch in the 2005 Atari game Act of War: Direct Action
 Task Force X, a fictional organization in DC Comics
 Task Force X (Justice League Unlimited episode), a cartoon
 Task Force 72, an organization of model boat builders
 Task Force 1942, a PC game
 Task Force, an Apple IIGS game by Visual Concepts in 1990
 Einsatzgruppen, death force of Nazi Germany.

See also 
 Internet Engineering Task Force, a standards organization
 Internet Research Task Force
 Jewish Task Force, a Kahanist organization in the United States
 Joint Task Force
 Joint Task Force (video game)